Shahkar Bineshpajooh (born 13 December 1972 in Tehran, Iran) is an Iranian poet, translator, composer, and singer.

Bineshpahjooh has performed with orchestras in Europe and North America and translated works from Pablo Neruda and Bertolt Brecht into Persian. He has written several books, some of which have been banned by the Government of Iran.

Bineshpahjooh studied political geography, urban planning, and music composition. He received his doctorate degree in urban planning in 2002 with high honors.

Achievements
In 1994, Bineshpajooh received his bachelor's degree in Economic Geography. Supervised the first post-revolution Guitar Concert in Iran.  In 1995, tried to stage the first Fusion Music Concert (Performance was banned). In 1996, Bineshpajooh received his master's degree in Political Geography.

In 1997, Bineshpajooh released his “The Lady of Orient” album. In 1998, he participated in the first as well as the last Pop Music Festival in Iran. Subsequently, he was banned for five years from performing any concert in Iran.  In 2000, Bineshpajooh produced and recorded the album “The Note (Eskenas).” In 2002, he received his Ph.D. degree in Urban Planning .  In 2003, he released his book of songs “The Naderi Cafe.”

In 2004, Bineshpajooh published “The Note” following four years of awaiting government release.  He also translated and published Pablo Neruda's “The Eternity of a Kiss.” That same year, Bineshpajooh conducted interviews with BBC, Daily Telegraph, Times, Reuters and others. He attempted to publish his book “The Idiotland” published, but it was banned by the Iranian government.

In 2005, Bineshpajooh produced and recorded the album “Your Majesty,” and wrote the book “I am not politicized”: both works were banned.  He also translated and released Bertolt Brecht's selected poems under the title “Mr. Prime Minister.”

In 2006, Bineshpajooh's new book, “The Humans Lineage,” was banned. He was allowed to release the album “Literature of another ilk” – six of 23 songs were released but the rest were denied.  In 2007 Bineshpajooh began recording Shahkar's new album in Paris.

In 2008 Bineshpajooh performed “Sleep by My Side” and “Que Hiciste,” with the Yerevan Opera Orchestra. In 2009, he performed with Armenian Philharmonic Orchestra.

In 2011, Bineshpajooh started the recording “Havaye Esgh” and “Hala to Khabi” with maestro Shardad Rohani for performance.

Performances 
Ukraine's National Radio and Television Symphony Orchestra and Kyiv's Opera Orchestra.Los Angeles (Microsoft Theater)Washington D.C. (Warner Theatre) New York (Queens College) Boston (Berklee Performance Center)Houston (Baptist University) Dallas (Eisemann Center) San Francisco (Palace of Fine Arts) New York (The Space)Chicago (Copernicus Center) Cologne, Germany (Tanzbrunnen) Hamburg (Hamburg Philharmonie)
Houston (Baptist University) Dallas (Eisemann Center) San Francisco (Palace of Fine Arts) San Jose (Cupertino) Toronto (Roy Thomson Hall) London (Central Hall)

Publications
1999 Published I like your hands book
2003 Published Naderi Cafe book (melody collections)
2004 Published Eskenas (Banknote) album, Publishing "Eternity of a kiss",Translating "Pablo Neroda"s poetries
2005 Published Man siasi nistam (I'm not political) book
2005 Translated Aghaye nokhostvazir (Mr. Prime Minister and khiabane kaenat (Universe Ave.)

References

External links 
 Official website 
 Iran's self-styled rapping aristocrat (BBC)

1972 births
Living people
Poets from Tehran
People from Tehran
Singers from Tehran
Iranian pop singers
Iranian songwriters
Iranian male singers
Iranian pop musicians
Persian-language singers
Iranian singer-songwriters
21st-century Iranian male singers